East Mecklenburg High School is a public secondary school in Charlotte, North Carolina, United States, and one of 21 high schools in the Charlotte-Mecklenburg Schools system. The principal of the school is Richard "Rick" Parker. East Mecklenburg High School is partial magnet school in Charlotte-Mecklenburg Schools. It is part of the International Baccalaureate program. East Mecklenburg students come from many middle school areas such as Albemarle Road, Carmel, Queens Grant, Crestdale, Eastway, J.T. Williams, McClintock, Mint Hill, Randolph, Northeast, and Northridge.

History 
Founded in 1950, East Mecklenburg had only grades 10, 11, and 12 until the 1997–98 school year, when ninth graders were added. East Mecklenburg served as the high school for all of eastern Mecklenburg County until 1989, when Providence High School opened.

Student profile 
East Mecklenburg High (or simply East Meck or East) touts one of the most diverse student bodies in Charlotte. For the 2011–2012 school year, the school of 1,686 students reported the following racial breakdown to CMS: 48.27% African-American, 23.90% White, 17.02% Hispanic, 6.29% Asian and Pacific/Hawaiian Islanders, 3.80% Multi-racial, and 0.71% American Indian/Alaskan Native.

Classes 
East Mecklenburg offers a wide array of classes to its students. The most challenging are those found in its International Baccalaureate program and its 23 Advanced Placement courses. The school also hosts a top-notch special education department, known as its Exceptional Children program. More than 30 faculty members serve as resources and assistants in the program. The AutoTech program and Culinary department offer technical skills courses to those students not interested in intensive college prep.

East Mecklenburg is one of five High Schools in North Carolina that has an Academy of Engineering program. Over 20 Students were accepted into the program which began in the Fall of 2011. The program has been carefully designed to introduce students to a wide variety of engineering principles, PLTW classes for the program include; Introduction of Engineering Design, Principles of Engineering, Civil Engineering & Architecture, Bio-technical Engineering, and Engineering Design and Development.

Athletics 

East Meck competes in the Southwestern 4A conference of the North Carolina High School Athletic Association (NCHSAA). Team colors are blue and yellow and the school mascot is an eagle.

In 2008, the boys' basketball team won the 4A state championship, defeating the Apex High School Cougars 73–61.

The East Meck rugby team won the 2008 Division II State Championship, and in its second full year, won the 2009 Division I state championship after defeating crosstown rival Myers Park in the title game. In 2010 they were runners-up for Division I State Championship's losing to West Mecklenburg High School 25–12.

The boys' cross country team have won six cross country state titles, including a three-peat from 1990–92. Members of East Meck cross country designed and built Charlotte's McAlpine Greenway Park cross country course, the site of major meets such as the Wendy's Invitational and the Southern regional qualifying race of the Foot Locker Cross Country Championships.

NCHSAA State Championships
 Men's Basketball: 2008
 Men's Indoor Track: 2000
 Men's Outdoor Track: 1997
 Men's Cross Country: 1960, 1973, 1986, 1990, 1991, 1992
 Men's Tennis: 1973
 Women's Indoor Track: 1991
 Women's Cross Country: 1982
 Women's Swimming: 1989
 Football: 1977
 Men's Soccer: 1968, 1969

Awards 
Based on its proportion of graduating seniors taking AP and IB tests, East was ranked among the 500 top high schools in the nation by Newsweek.

Also frequently earning awards is East Meck's culinary program. Since 2005, East's culinary team has won gold medals in state and national competition. In April 2008, senior Luis Rojas was named the National High School Chef of the Year by Johnson & Wales University in the dessert category, garnering him more than $80,000 in scholarship money.

The Eagle, East Mecklenburg's school newspaper, was named a Paper of Distinction in 2008 by the North Carolina Scholastic Media Association.

Notable alumni 
 Brad Anderson, professional wrestler, son of Gene Anderson
 Rodney Austin, former NFL offensive tackle
 Byron Dinkins, former NBA player
 Mike Fox, head baseball coach at the University of North Carolina, one of only six men to play in and then coach his alma mater to the College World Series
 Evan Harding, professional soccer player for the Charlotte Eagles
 Carter Heyward, paved the way for the recognition of women as priests in the Episcopal Church
 Jeremy Ingram, professional basketball player
 Macoumba Kandji, professional soccer player
 Jennifer Loven, journalist and former White House press correspondent for the Associated Press
 Joan Nesbit, cross country national champion and United States representative at the 1996 Summer Olympics in the 10,000-meter run
 Jim Gulley, politician
 Richard Edwin Parris Jr., member of alternative metal grunge band Animal Bag
 Eddie Payne, college basketball coach
 Mike Pope, former NFL coach, 4-time Super Bowl champion as tight end coach with the New York Giants
 Joe Posnanski, American sports journalist
 Jeff Reed, former NFL kicker for the Pittsburgh Steelers and 2-time Super Bowl champion
 Dustin Rhodes, aka "Golddust", best known for his multiple tenures with the WWE
 Jennifer Roberts, politician, community activist, and the 58th Mayor of Charlotte
 Richard Vinroot, politician, attorney, and the 52nd Mayor of Charlotte
 Earl Wentz, pianist, composer, and musical director
 Barry Windham, professional wrestler, son of Blackjack Mulligan

References

External links 
  East Meck's school website

International Baccalaureate schools in North Carolina
Public high schools in North Carolina
Educational institutions established in 1950
Schools in Charlotte, North Carolina
Magnet schools in North Carolina
1950 establishments in North Carolina